Ely do Amparo, commonly known as just Ely (May 14, 1921 – March 9, 1991), was a Brazilian football central defender, who played in two World Cups.

Career
Ely do Amparo started his career with América, in 1939. He joined Canto do Rio in 1940, leaving the club in 1945 to join Vasco. Ely, as part of Vasco's Expresso da Vitória squad, won the Campeonato Carioca in 1945, 1947, 1949, 1950 and in 1952, winning the South American Club Championship in 1948 as well. Ely do Amparo was transferred to Sport in 1953, winning the Campeonato Pernambucano in that year and in 1955, when he retired.

National team
He played 19 games for the Brazil national team, including being part of the World Cup squad in 1950 and in 1954. He was part of the squad that won the Panamerican Championship in 1952.

Honors

Club
Sport
Campeonato Pernambucano: 1953, 1955

Vasco
Campeonato Carioca: 1945, 1947, 1949, 1950, 1952

Country
Brazil
Panamerican Championship: 1952

References

1921 births
1991 deaths
Brazilian footballers
Brazil international footballers
1950 FIFA World Cup players
1954 FIFA World Cup players
America Football Club (RJ) players
Canto do Rio Football Club players
CR Vasco da Gama players
Sport Club do Recife players
Association football defenders